Tõnu Saar (6 August 1944 – 12 July 2022) was an Estonian actor.

In 1972, he graduated from the Tallinn State Conservatory's Performing Arts Department. From 1963 until 1968, he worked as a photographer. From 1972 until 1980, he worked at Estonian Youth Theatre, and from 1980 until 1998, at Estonian Drama Theatre. Besides theatre roles he appeared in a number of films and on television.

Filmography

 1971: Don Juan Tallinnas
 1977: Surma hinda küsi surnutelt
 1978: Inquest of Pilot Pirx
 1980: Metskannikesed
 1981: Young Russia
 1987: Madude oru needus
 1994: Ameerika mäed		
 1994: Tulivesi

References

1944 births
2022 deaths
Estonian male stage actors
Estonian male film actors
Estonian male television actors
20th-century Estonian male actors
21st-century Estonian male actors
Estonian Academy of Music and Theatre alumni
People from Jõgeva Parish